The 2003 10,000 Lakes Festival in Detroit Lakes, Minnesota was held July 1 through July 4.

2003 Lineup
The musicians that performed at the festival were Widespread Panic, Allman Brothers Band, Gov't Mule, moe., Galactic, Leftover Salmon, O.A.R., Leo Kottke, The Big Wu, Particle, Jerry Joseph and the Jackmormons, Donna The Buffalo, Wookiefoot, Topaz, Echo, Big Tasty, Kung Fu Hippies, The Lost Trailers, Sojorn, Front Porch Swingin' Liquor Pigs, Jim Bianco, Tim Sparks, McCloskey Brothers Band, Foggy Bottom Band and the Jack Brass Band.

10,000 Lakes Festival
2003 in American music
2003 music festivals
10000